Franklin Senior High School, also known as the Alva Neal Community Building, is a historic high school located at Franklin, Johnson County, Indiana. It was built in 1938, and is a three-story, "L"-shaped, red brick building with some Italian Renaissance style embellishments. Its construction was partially funded by a grant from the Public Works Administration. It was originally connected to an older school building by a covered walkway. The building ceased use as a high school in 1960.

It was listed on the National Register of Historic Places in 2012.

References

Public Works Administration in Indiana
School buildings on the National Register of Historic Places in Indiana
School buildings completed in 1938
Renaissance Revival architecture in Indiana
Buildings and structures in Johnson County, Indiana
National Register of Historic Places in Johnson County, Indiana